Shadows is a 1919 American silent film drama produced by Samuel Goldwyn and directed by Reginald Barker. It stars opera singer Geraldine Farrar.

This is a lost film except for a one-reel fragment at the Library of Congress.

Plot
As described in a film magazine, Muriel Barnes (Farrar) is the loving and happy wife of conservative New Yorker Judson Barnes (Sills) and the devoted mother of a child (Smith), when a promoter of a fake mining enterprise, Frank Craftley (Truesdell), gains social access to her home. Craftley has never met her before, but his side partner Jack McGoff (Santschi) has a photograph of Muriel from her previous life in Alaska under the name Cora Lamont. McGoff had deceived her by marrying her although he already had a living wife. He then forced her into the job as a dance hall girl. She escaped by shooting him in self-defense and then fleeing Alaska. Without knowing these details but guessing some general circumstances, Craftley works on her fears until she induces her husband to go out West to inspect the salted claim. McGoff stays behind and visits Muriel's home at night, and she permits him to enter her boudoir. Knowing that a policeman is courting one of the servants on the floor below, she scatters some jewels to give the appearance of a robbery, and, when McGoff attempts to embrace her, screams for help. Fleeing arrest, McGoff shoots at the policeman, and is later killed in the resulting scrimmage. His death ends the shadows in Muriel's life.

Cast
Geraldine Farrar - Muriel Barnes / Cora Lamont
Milton Sills - Judson Barnes
Tom Santschi - Jack McGoff
Frederick Truesdell - Frank Craftley
George Smith - The Child
Charles Slattery - unknown role
Robert Harvey - unknown role
Jean Armour - unknown role

References

External links

 Shadows at IMDb.com
allmovie/synopsis; Shadows

1919 films
Films directed by Reginald Barker
American silent feature films
Goldwyn Pictures films
1919 drama films
Silent American drama films
American black-and-white films
Lost American films
1919 lost films
Lost drama films
1910s American films